Osceola County Courthouse can refer to multiple county courthouses:

 Osceola County Courthouse (Florida)
 Osceola County Courthouse (Iowa)